Eilean Dearg may refer to:

Eilean Dearg, Loch Ruel, Argyll, Scotland
Eilean Dearg, Knoydart, an island in the Inner Hebrides